WTXF-TV (channel 29) is a television station in Philadelphia, Pennsylvania, United States, serving as the market's Fox network outlet. Owned and operated by the network's Fox Television Stations division, the station maintains studios on Market Street in Center City and a transmitter on the Roxborough tower farm.

History

Early years
The station signed on the air on May 16, 1965, as independent station WIBF-TV. The station was founded by the Fox family, who held real estate interests in the Philadelphia suburb of Jenkintown; William L. Fox was the station's principal shareholder, along with his brother Irwin C. Fox, their father Benjamin Fox, and business associate Dorothy Kotin. The Fox family, who had already been operating WIBF-FM (103.9, now WPHI-FM) since November 1960, was awarded a construction permit to build channel 29 in August 1962. Channel 29's original studio was co-located with WIBF-FM in the Fox family's Benson East apartment building on Old York Road in Jenkintown. WIBF-TV was the first commercial UHF station in Philadelphia, and the first of three UHF independents in the Philadelphia market to sign on during 1965, with WPHL-TV (channel 17) and WKBS-TV (channel 48) both making their debuts in September. WIBF-TV struggled at first, in part because it signed on only a year after the Federal Communications Commission (FCC) required television manufacturers to include UHF tuning capability.

Prior to the debut of WIBF-TV, there was an earlier attempt to put a channel 29 station on the air in Philadelphia. WIP radio, then owned by Gimbels department store, was granted an FCC construction permit in November 1952 as part of a wave of UHF station applications and assignments following a four-year-long freeze on permit awards. Intended to be called WIP-TV, this station did not make it to air as WIP relinquished its construction permit in May 1954.

By the fall of 1968, the Foxes disclosed that their broadcasting operations were operating with a deficit of more than $2 million. It would prove to be a major factor in the decision to sell WIBF-TV to Cincinnati-based Taft Broadcasting, a transaction which closed in May 1969 for $4.5 million (including assumption of debt), at the time the most spent for a UHF facility. Taft also owned WNEP-TV (channel 16) in Scranton, whose signal area also included coverage of the Lehigh Valley, which is part of the Philadelphia market; indeed, WNEP has operated a translator there for years. When applying to acquire channel 29 at the FCC, Taft sought a waiver to keep both stations; the FCC at that time normally did not allow common ownership of two stations with overlapping coverage areas, even if they were in different markets.  The FCC granted the waiver  and the two neighboring outlets were co-owned until 1973, when Taft sold WNEP-TV to a group composed of the station's executives and employees.

Taft assumed control of channel 29 in mid-1969 and changed the call letters to WTAF-TV in November. Under Taft's ownership, WTAF-TV soon established itself as a local powerhouse. Channel 29 ran programs from Taft's archive, such as Hanna-Barbera cartoons, which from 1979 onward were distributed by Worldvision Enterprises (which Taft had purchased), and later on the Quinn Martin library. By the start of the 1980s, WTAF had passed WKBS-TV as Philadelphia's leading independent station. From the mid-1970s through the mid-1980s, it was also carried on several cable providers on the New Jersey side of the New York City market, as far north as The Oranges. When WKBS-TV went dark in the late summer of 1983, the station placed advertisements in TV Guide and local papers reminding Philadelphia viewers that channel 29 was still around and that channel 48's former audience was welcome to sample channel 29. However, the station passed on picking up any of channel 48's shows, most of which went to WPHL-TV. Channel 29 also aired network shows that ABC affiliate WPVI-TV (channel 6) and then-NBC affiliate KYW-TV (channel 3) preempted in favor of local programming.

WTAF-TV also became a strong sports station. At various times, it owned the broadcast rights to Major League Baseball's Philadelphia Phillies (Taft also owned a small portion of the team for much of the 1980s), the NHL's Philadelphia Flyers and the NBA's Philadelphia 76ers. The station also carried games of the Philadelphia Bell of the short-lived World Football League in 1974–75. (On August 29, 1975, the Bell were playing a televised contest against the Southern California Sun in Anaheim. Already starting late at night due to the time difference, WTAF viewers never got to see the end of the 58-39 Sun victory, as the station signed off before the game was completed.)

Joining Fox
On October 9, 1986, WTAF-TV became a charter affiliate of the fledgling Fox television network. Initially channel 29's schedule did not change drastically, as Fox didn't air a full week of programming until 1993; for all intents and purposes, it was still programmed as an independent outlet.

Taft sold its independent and Fox-affiliated stations, including WTAF-TV, to the Norfolk, Virginia-based TVX Broadcast Group in February 1987. On June 1, 1988, the new owners changed channel 29's calls to WTXF-TV. The Taft purchase created a large debt load for TVX, and as a result, the company sold a number of its smaller stations. Paramount Pictures purchased a majority stake in TVX in 1989. The following year, after branding itself as TV 29 for many years, the station changed its on-air branding to Fox 29. In 1991, Paramount acquired the remaining stock in TVX that it did not already own, and the company's name was changed to the Paramount Stations Group, with WTXF as its largest station by market size.

Becoming a Fox-owned outlet

In August 1993, Fox shockingly announced its intention to purchase rival independent WGBS-TV (channel 57, now WPSG) and move its programming there in April 1994. As staffers at WTXF-TV continued to reel in the aftermath of that announcement, its corporate parent was undergoing a transition of its own. Only one month later in September, the original Viacom agreed in principle to merge with Paramount. Not long after that, West Chester-based home shopping giant QVC mounted a competing bid and the two firms entered into an intense bidding war, in which Viacom ultimately prevailed in February 1994, with the deal closing on March 11, 1994.

Meanwhile, in late October 1993, Paramount announced plans to create a new network, the United Paramount Network (UPN), which it would co-own with Chris-Craft Industries. The initial affiliation plans called for WTXF, which was set to lose Fox to WGBS, becoming the Philadelphia outlet for the new network, which was targeted to launch in January 1995. However, Fox's purchase of WGBS fell through in early 1994 due to the FCC's concerns over Fox's foreign ownership, making it increasingly unlikely that Paramount would want to drop Fox programming from channel 29 (particularly after Fox acquired the rights to show games from the NFL's National Football Conference, including most Philadelphia Eagles games); nonetheless, during the spring, WTXF gradually de-emphasized its Fox affiliation, changing its branding to simply "29".

Several months later, the shoe dropped on the biggest affiliation shuffle in Philadelphia television history. On July 14, 1994, Westinghouse Broadcasting, owners of KYW-TV, entered into a longterm affiliation agreement with CBS. This resulted in KYW-TV dropping NBC in favor of CBS, which would then sell its longtime owned-and-operated station, WCAU-TV (channel 10). Several months earlier, Fox entered into a multi-station, multi-year partnership with New World Communications. New World and NBC emerged as the leading bidders for WCAU, with New World intending to switch WCAU to Fox if it emerged victorious; Fox also joined the bidding for WCAU in case New World's bid failed. However, Paramount/Viacom changed its Philadelphia plans and decided to sell WTXF-TV to Fox, making channel 29 a Fox-owned station; this effectively handed WCAU-TV to NBC. Almost simultaneously, Viacom bought WGBS-TV and made it Philadelphia's UPN outlet. Both transactions involving Viacom and Fox closed on August 25, 1995; three weeks later on September 10, WCAU-TV and KYW-TV swapped their affiliations.

Soon after taking control of channel 29, Fox rebranded it as Fox Philadelphia (similar to how Chicago sister station WFLD was branded as Fox Chicago) with the channel number used sparingly and the call letters mostly relegated to legal IDs; this was because WTXF, to this day, is normally not on channel 29 on area cable systems (though for the first few months, it was merely branded as "Fox" with the call letters below a color-changing Fox logo in promos). As a Fox owned-and-operated station, WTXF immediately added more first run talk and reality shows to the schedule. Throughout the mid-to-late 1990s, WTXF was available nationally to satellite television providers as the East Coast Fox feed, most notably on PrimeStar.

In 2003, WTXF rebranded back to Fox 29 for the first time since 1994 to create a consistent use of the Fox (channel number) branding across all Fox-owned stations. WTXF also underwent a major overhaul of its studio facilities in Old City Philadelphia, with a "Window on the World"-type studio making its debut on June 6, 2005. The "Window of the World" studio was originally intended to be used for the station's morning newscast.

It is a historical irony that the station, originally owned locally by the Fox family as WIBF-TV, is now owned by Los Angeles-based Fox Broadcasting Company.

On December 14, 2017, The Walt Disney Company, owner of ABC and WPVI-TV, announced its intent to buy WTXF's parent company, 21st Century Fox, for $52.4 billion; the sale excluded the Fox Television Stations unit (including WTXF), the Fox network, Fox News, Fox Sports 1 and the MyNetworkTV programming service, which were transferred to a separate company.

News operation
WTXF presently broadcasts 50 hours of locally produced newscasts each week (with nine hours each weekday and three hours each on Saturdays and Sundays); in regards to the number of hours devoted to news programming, it is the highest local newscast output among the Philadelphia market's broadcast television stations, and highest in the Commonwealth of Pennsylvania in general. In areas of central New Jersey where the Philadelphia and New York City markets overlap, WTXF shares resources with New York City sister station and fellow Fox O&O WNYW. The stations share reporters for stories occurring in New Jersey.

Throughout the early 1980s, WTAF-TV aired the syndicated Independent Network News, which was produced by then-independent station WPIX in New York City. This lasted until channel 29 began its own in-house news department. Taft Broadcasting started a news department for the station in the spring of 1986, with the debut of a nightly 10 p.m. newscast. It was the second attempt at a primetime newscast in the market, after WKBS-TV ran a short-lived program in the late 1970s. Channel 29's effort has been the longest-running, and the most successful; it was expanded to an hour-long newscast in 1990. On April 1, 1996, shortly after channel 29 became a Fox-owned station, the station replaced the children's programs that had been airing on weekday mornings in favor of what at its launch was a three-hour long newscast called Good Day Philadelphia; partnered with it was a straighter newscast called Good Day at 6:30, which was replaced in the fall of 1997 by the hour-long Fox Morning News. The overall branding of news at this point was Fox News Philadelphia or just Fox News; it is possible that potential viewer confusion with the Fox News Channel played a part in the station's rebranding back to "Fox 29" in 2003.

On October 1, 2006, WTXF became the second television station in the Philadelphia market to begin broadcasting its local newscasts in high definition. Eight days later on October 9, the station debuted a half-hour midday newscast at 11 a.m. On January 22, 2007, a new hour-long newscast at 5 p.m. debuted, enabling channel 29 to go head-to-head with two of the three other network-owned stations (WPVI-TV and WCAU). On October 6, 2007, WTXF launched hour-long 6 p.m. newscasts on Saturday and Sunday evenings. From September 1 to November 3, 2008, WTXF aired an election-themed 11 p.m. newscast called The Last Word, anchored by 5 p.m. anchor Kerri-Lee Halkett.

On November 13, 2008, Fox Television Stations and NBC Local Media entered into an agreement to test a system that would allow stations owned by Fox and NBC to pool news resources ranging from sharing field video footage to sharing aerial helicopter footage. WTXF and WCAU were the first stations to undertake the Local News Service arrangement as an effective way to deal with the difficulties in the costs of running news operations. On September 7, 2009, channel 29 expanded its morning and evening news programming: Good Day Philadelphia was expanded to five hours on that date with the addition of an hour at 9 a.m. (the fifth hour of the broadcast replaced The Morning Show with Mike & Juliet, whose co-host Mike Jerrick returned to WTXF as 7–10 a.m. anchor of Good Day on July 27, 2009), the station also expanded its 6 p.m. newscast to weekdays as a half-hour broadcast. On March 29, 2010, WTXF expanded Good Day once again with the start time moved back by a half-hour to 4:30 a.m.

On September 8, 2010, anchor Kerri-Lee Halkett went on a personal leave; a WTXF representative said that Halkett would return to the station in mid-October of that year. However, on September 23, 2010, it was announced that Halkett had decided to leave channel 29 to relocate to Connecticut (where her husband was living), allowing Halkett to accept a job as an anchor for Hartford NBC O&O WVIT (channel 30). Lauren Cohn took over Halkett's co-anchoring duties with Thomas Drayton on the weeknight 5, 6 and 10 p.m. newscasts; Cohn was replaced one year later by freelance reporter Kerry Barrett.

In 2011, WTXF began using the AFD #10 broadcast flag to present their newscasts in letterboxed widescreen for viewers watching on cable television through 4:3 television sets (in a similar manner to what certain cable channels such as Fox News Channel, HLN and CNN have done around or since that point).

In addition to its own newscasts, on July 8, 2013, WTXF began airing Chasing New Jersey, a daily New Jersey-focused public affairs program. Chasing New Jersey, which is produced by Fairfax Productions (a production company led by WTXF's vice president and general manager) from a studio in Trenton and hosted by Bill Spadea, was designed to replace the 10:00 p.m. newscast on sister station WWOR-TV. The program was cancelled in July 2020. On September 20, 2014, WTXF debuted weekend editions of the Good Day Philadelphia morning newscast (under the title #Fox29Weekend) at 8:00 a.m., which ran for two hours on Saturdays and one hour on Sundays. In February 2016, the Sunday edition of Good Day Philadelphia Weekend was extended to become a two-hour broadcast and both editions' start times were moved up by an hour to air from 7 to 9 a.m. This lasted until late 2020 when both editions were reduced to one hour each from 8 to 9 a.m.

On August 1, 2016, the station debuted a half-hour newscast at 11 p.m. which is broadcast from a revamped studio that was revealed that same night on the 10 p.m. broadcast. This shorter edition is currently anchored by Jason Martinez and Shiba Russell, who also anchor the 5, 6 and 10 p.m. editions. Martinez joined the station in June 2019 and was partnered with Shaina Humphries, who had been hired in February of the same year. It was originally anchored by Lucy Noland, who co-anchored the 5, 6 and 10 p.m. editions alongside Iain Page until Page departed the station on January 24, 2019 to pursue other interests, thus making Noland the sole anchor of all four editions of the newscast. This continued until February 18, 2019, when Humphries joined the station and officially became the lead anchor for the 6 and 11 p.m. newscasts, while Noland retained her position as anchor of the 5 and 10 p.m. newscasts. Noland left the station after five years and her last broadcast was on May 30, 2019. Martinez officially joined the broadcast on June 17 as Humphries' co-anchor. The pair anchored together until May 26, 2022, when Humphries announced on social media that she would be departing the station to pursue another assignment closer to her hometown of Chicago. Humphries is now an anchor for CBS O&O station WWJ-TV in Detroit, which will launch an in-house newscast in the fall of 2022.
On July 7, 2022, it was revealed that former WXIA-TV anchor Russell would be joining the station to become Martinez's new co-anchor on all four broadcasts starting on August 15. On that date, Russell officially debuted anchoring the 10 and 11 p.m. newscasts. Sports anchor Breland Moore (who officially joined the station on May 24, 2021) and meteorologist Kathy Orr carry over from the 10 p.m. edition. This expansion only occurs on the Sunday through Friday newscasts as the Saturday edition ends at 11 p.m. The expanded edition was done on Sundays during the 2018 NFL season as the broadcast was followed by a simulcast of NFL Network's NFL GameDay Prime program but this was not continued for the 2019 season. The broadcast is currently followed by a repeat edition of the locally produced daily entertainment program The Feed at Night hosted by Good Day Philadelphia 4–6 a.m. anchor Thomas Drayton and 6–10 a.m. co-host Alex Holley.

On January 5, 2017, the weekday edition of Good Day Philadelphia was expanded to six hours with Fox 29 Morning News, which originally aired from 4 to 6 a.m., being rebranded to Good Day Philadelphia.

In January 2020, the station made a decision to forego the traditional 6 p.m. newscast format to instead focus on a more fast-paced news program to be akin to Good Day Philadelphia. The show, called The Six, features a more condensed format on delivering the day's top headlines and also focus on topics that affect the community and the viewer. On November 16, 2021, the 10 p.m. newscast was relaunched as Fox 29 News 10 at 10, with a format in which the top news and sports stories and weather forecast were presented in six 10-minute segments anchored individually by Martinez (Sunday through Thursday) and by Dawn Timmoney or Chris O'Donnell (Friday and Saturday). This format continued until August 14, 2022. The following evening would see the newscast return to a regular newscast format and the broadcast being officially re-named The 10 O'Clock News, which also marked Shiba Russell joining the show as Martinez's co-anchor. The 11 p.m. edition is still a traditional newscast and retains the Fox 29 News at 11pm name.

Notable current on-air staff
 Mike Jerrick – co-host of Good Day Philadelphia (6–10 a.m.)
 Kathy Orr – meteorologist
 Howard Eskin – host of Game Day Live

Notable former on-air staff
John Bolaris – meteorologist
Joyce Evans – anchor
Sheinelle Jones – reporter/anchor (now at NBC News)
Clayton Morris (now co-host of Fox & Friends Weekend on Fox News Channel)
SallyAnn Mosey – meteorologist (now at News 12 Westchester and News 12 Hudson Valley)
Dave Price – forecaster last seen on WNBC
Dawn Stensland – anchor (2001–2009); now at WPHT radio

Technical information

Subchannels
The station's digital signal is multiplexed:

Analog-to-digital conversion
WTXF-TV shut down its analog signal, over UHF channel 29, on June 12, 2009, the official date in which full-power television stations in the United States transitioned from analog to digital broadcasts under federal mandate. The station's digital signal continued to broadcast on its pre-transition UHF channel 42. Through the use of PSIP, digital television receivers display the station's virtual channel as its former UHF analog channel 29.

Translator

On December 29, 2014, WTXF-TV announced the launch of their Allentown translator to allow northern tier viewers to better receive and watch Fox 29 and its sub-channels.

Cable and satellite carriage

Out-of-market coverage
WTXF is carried in central New Jersey in parts of Hunterdon, Middlesex, Monmouth, Somerset and Warren, and Morris counties, usually on either channel 12 or 16. It is available to all customers in Ocean County with Comcast or Cablevision.

Comcast added WTXF's HD feed to its lineups in Ocean and southern Middlesex counties as well as Roosevelt and Lambertville, New Jersey on August 22, 2012 on digital channel 905.

In Plumsted Township, Ocean County, WTXF is carried in lieu of WNYW as Plumsted is served by Comcast's Garden State system (based out of Mount Holly, Burlington County) which does not carry any New York City stations. However, New York local channels are available on DirecTV and Dish Network in Plumsted and all of Ocean County.

In southern Delaware, WTXF (along with Washington, D.C. sister station WTTG) is available to Mediacom customers in the Millsboro area, and to Comcast customers in much of the rest of Sussex County. Although WBOC acts as the market's Fox affiliate through a subchannel of the station that carries programming from the network, the NFL designates the Salisbury/Rehoboth Beach television market as the broadcast territory for the Washington Commanders and Baltimore Ravens. Through Comcast's carriage of WTXF in southern Delaware, Philadelphia Eagles games are also viewable in that region. The station is also carried on cable in Cecil County, Maryland. There is no satellite carriage of the station outside of the Philadelphia market.

2010 Cablevision carriage dispute
On October 16, 2010, WTXF was among the Fox-owned broadcast stations and cable channels that were taken off Cablevision's Hamilton and Jersey Shore cable systems of as the result of a retransmission dispute between Cablevision and Fox's parent company, News Corporation (who also pulled the signal of sister stations WNYW (channel 5) and MyNetworkTV affiliate WWOR-TV (channel 9) on Cablevision's metropolitan New York system). In addition News Corporation had pulled Fox Business Network, Fox Deportes and National Geographic Wild from Cablevision systems in both the Philadelphia and New York markets. The shutdown came the morning the Phillies were set to begin play in the 2010 National League Championship Series, and also affected Fox's regional coverage of Philadelphia Eagles football games.

The removal of WTXF and the three Fox-owned cable channels was due to an impasse between Fox and Cablevision on a retransmission agreement renewal in which Cablevision claims that News Corporation demanded $150 million a year for access to 12 Fox channels, including those that News Corporation had removed in the dispute. On October 14, 2010, Cablevision said that it was willing to submit to binding arbitration and called on Fox not to pull the plug on the channels, though News Corporation chose to reject Cablevision's call for arbitration, stating that it would "reward Cablevision for refusing to negotiate fairly". On October 30, 2010, News Corporation and Cablevision reached a deal, ending the dispute and restoring WTXF, WNYW, WWOR, and the three News Corp-owned cable channels to Cablevision's lineup.

References

External links
 
 Photos of WTXF's studio

TXF-TV
Fox network affiliates
Movies! affiliates
Buzzr affiliates
TheGrio affiliates
Fox Television Stations
Television channels and stations established in 1965
National Hockey League over-the-air television broadcasters
Taft Broadcasting
Low-power television stations in the United States
1965 establishments in Pennsylvania
Former Viacom subsidiaries